Norte Grande Geography Journal or Revista de geografía Norte Grande is an academic journal published by the Pontifical Catholic University of Chile. Its scope was initially confined to geography related topics of northern Chile. In 1980 it changed its name from Norte Grande to Revista de geografía Norte Grande reflecting a broadened scope to encompass all of Chile extending to Latin American topics.

Sources
Revista de geografía Norte Grande Retrieved 10 September 2012.
Revista de geografía Norte Grande: About the journal.  Retrieved 10 September 2012.

Multilingual journals
Triannual journals
Magazines published in Chile
Pontifical Catholic University of Chile academic journals
Publications established in 1974
Geography journals
1974 establishments in Chile
Open access journals
Latin American studies journals